Christian Mejdahl (born 31 December 1939 at Tvøroyri in the Faroe Islands) is a Danish politician representing the liberal party, Venstre. He was a Member of Parliament—the Folketing—from 9 September 1987 to 13 November 2007, and served as Speaker of the Folketing from 18 March 2003.

He lives in Løgstør in Himmerland.

References

1939 births
Living people
Speakers of the Folketing